Richard John Harden (born 16 August 1965, Bridgwater, Somerset, England) is a former English first-class cricketer. He was a right-handed batsman, who played for Somerset (1985–1998), where he was awarded his county cap in 1989, and Yorkshire (1999–2000). He also had two stints playing for Central Districts in New Zealand. He is married to Rachel Reese. They have three children together.

References

External links

1965 births
Living people
People from Bridgwater
English cricketers
Central Districts cricketers
Somerset cricketers
Yorkshire cricketers